"Don't Come Around Here No More" is a song written by Tom Petty of Tom Petty and the Heartbreakers and David A. Stewart of Eurythmics. It was released in February 1985 as the lead single from Tom Petty and the Heartbreakers' Southern Accents album.

Background and writing
The original inspiration was a romantic encounter that producer David A. Stewart of Eurythmics had with Stevie Nicks of Fleetwood Mac.  On The Howard Stern Show, Stewart explained that the title's phrase was actually uttered by Nicks. She had broken up with Eagles singer and guitarist Joe Walsh the night before, and invited Stewart to her place for a party after an early Eurythmics show in Los Angeles. Stewart did not know who she was at the time, but went anyway. When the partygoers all disappeared to a bathroom for a couple of hours to snort cocaine, he decided to go upstairs to bed. He woke up at 5 a.m. to find Nicks in his room trying on Victorian clothing and described the entire scenario as very much reminiscent of Alice in Wonderland. Later that morning, when Walsh came by to find Nicks, Stewart heard Nicks throw Walsh out, saying "Don't come around here no more."

According to Nicks, the song was originally written for her album Rock a Little, but she declined it after Petty performed the vocals for her, feeling she could not do the song justice.

Reception 
"Don't Come Around Here No More" is widely regarded as one of Petty's best songs. In its contemporary review of the song, Cash Box said that it "features a surprisingly ethereal assortment of sounds including purely psychedelic guitars" and that "Petty’s gut-wrenching lead vocal...is the captivating soul of the song." In 2017, Billboard ranked the song number six on their list of the 20 greatest Tom Petty songs, and in 2020, Rolling Stone ranked the song number three on their list of the 50 greatest Tom Petty songs.

Music video 
The music video is themed around the 1865 Lewis Carroll novel Alice in Wonderland, and was directed by Jeff Stein.  Stewart appears as the caterpillar at the beginning, sitting on a mushroom with a hookah water pipe while playing a sitar. Petty appears in the video dressed as The Mad Hatter, and actress/singer Louise Foley played Alice. Alice eats a cake given to her by Stewart and tumbles into a black/white-patterned realm similar to the "Mad Tea Party" scene from Alice in Wonderland. She experiences a succession of bizarre events, culminating in her body being turned into a cake and eaten by the guests at the tea party. The video ends with Petty swallowing Alice whole, burping softly, and wiping his mouth with a napkin.

Personnel 

The Heartbreakers
Tom Petty – lead vocals, piano
Mike Campbell – guitar, bass synthesizer
Benmont Tench – string synthesizer
Stan Lynch – drums, percussion
Howie Epstein – bass guitar, vocals

Additional personnel
David A. Stewart – electric sitar, synthesizer, vocals
Dean Garcia – intro bass guitar
Daniel Rothmuller – cello
Marilyn Martin – backing vocals
Stephanie Spruill – backing vocals
Sharon Celani – backing vocals

Chart performance

References

1985 songs
1985 singles
Tom Petty songs
Songs written by Tom Petty
Songs written by David A. Stewart
Song recordings produced by Jimmy Iovine
Song recordings produced by Dave Stewart (musician and producer)
Songs based on actual events
Synth rock songs
MCA Records singles
Music based on Alice in Wonderland